Jacoba Cornelia "Co" Stelma (2 July 1907 – 30 August 1987) was a Dutch gymnast. She won the gold medal as a member of the Dutch gymnastics team at the 1928 Summer Olympics. She was born in The Hague and died in Brielle.

References
Profile

1907 births
1987 deaths
Dutch female artistic gymnasts
Olympic gymnasts of the Netherlands
Gymnasts at the 1928 Summer Olympics
Olympic gold medalists for the Netherlands
Medalists at the 1928 Summer Olympics
Gymnasts from The Hague
Olympic medalists in gymnastics
International Jewish Sports Hall of Fame inductees
20th-century Dutch women